The lira (plural lire; abbreviation: SML) was the currency of San Marino from the 1860s until it was replaced by the euro on 1 January 2002. It was equivalent and pegged to the Italian lira. Italian coins and banknotes and Vatican City coins were legal tender in San Marino, while Sammarinese coins, minted in Rome, were legal tender throughout Italy, as well as in the Vatican City.

Coins

San Marino's first coins were copper c.5, issued in 1864. These were followed by copper c.10, first issued in 1875. Although these copper coins were last issued in 1894, silver c.50, 1 Lira, 2 Lire and 5 Lire were issued in 1898, with the 1 Lira and 2 Lire also minted in 1906.

The Sammarinese coinage recommenced in 1931, with silver 5 Lire, 10 Lire and 20 Lire, to which bronze c.5 and c.10 were added in 1935. These coins were issued until 1938.

In 1972, San Marino began issuing coins again, in denominations of 1 Lira, 2 Lire, 5 Lire, 10 Lire, 20 Lire, 50 Lire, 100 Lire and 500 Lire, all of which were struck to the same specifications as the corresponding Italian coins. 200 Lire coins were added in 1978, followed by bimetallic 500 Lire and 1,000 Lire in 1982 and 1997, respectively. 50 Lire and 100 Lire were reduced in size in 1992. All of these modern issues changed design every year.

Lire coins for San Marino discontinued after the introduction of the euro. However, San Marino has licence to—and periodically does—issue its own euro coins.

See also
 Sammarinese euro coins
 Central Bank of San Marino

References

External links
 All coins from 1972 to 2000

Currencies of San Marino
Modern obsolete currencies
Currencies of Europe
Currencies replaced by the euro
1860s establishments in San Marino
2002 disestablishments in Europe